Sib is a technical term in the discipline of anthropology  which originally denoted a kinship group among Anglo-Saxon and other Germanic peoples.  In an extended sense, it then became the standard term for a variety of other kinds of lineal (matrilineal or patrilineal) or cognatic (i.e.,descended through links of both sexes) kinship groups. The word may also denote a member of such a group.

American anthropologists often used the term 'sib'  as the generic term for a category that breaks down into the sub-classifications of  patri-sib, referring to patrilineal clan descent, and matri-sib, to refer to matrilineal clan descent.

Footnotes

References
 
 
 
 
 

Anthropology